Two is an album by American jazz saxophonist Jemeel Moondoc and pianist Connie Crothers, which was recorded at Connie's Brooklyn loft in 2011 and released on Relative Pitch Records, a NYC based record label founded by Mike Panico and Kevin Reilly. It was the first time they recorded together and Moondoc's first studio recording in 15 years, the previous was Tri-P-Let.

Reception

The JazzTimes review by Mike Shanley states "Jazz duets often get described as 'conversations' between the two players, and this session clearly falls into that category. While a topic or two goes on a little too long, the overall discussion yields sharp points and empathetic support."

Track listing
All compositions by Moondoc / Crothers except where noted.
"Improvisation 1" – 6:25
"You Let Me Into Your Life" (Moondoc) – 11:48
"Improvisation 2" – 8:06
"Deep Friendship" (Crothers) – 5:31
"Improvisation 3" – 4:45
"Improvisation 4" – 5:55
"Improvisation 5" – 4:00
"Improvisation 6" – 7:23

Personnel
Jemeel Moondoc – alto sax
Connie Crothers – piano

References

2012 albums
Jemeel Moondoc albums
Connie Crothers albums